The Microbial Culture Collection (now called the National Centre for Microbial Resource, NCMR) in Pune, is India's microbial culture collection centre, recognized by World Federation for Culture Collections (WFCC), and has a status of International Depositary Authority (IDA).

The Microbial Culture Collection is a national facility funded by the Department of Biotechnology (DBT), Government of India. The MCC is affiliated to National Centre for Cell Science (NCCS), Pune, India. It is an affiliate member of the World Federation for Culture Collections (WFCC) and is registered with the World Data Centre for Microorganisms (WDCM, registration number 930). The main objectives of MCC are to act as a national depository, to supply authentic microbial cultures, and to provide related services to the scientific community working in research institutions, universities and industries.

The MCC was recognized by the World Intellectual Property Organization (WIPO), Geneva, Switzerland as an International Depository Authority (IDA) in April 2011. The deposit of microorganisms under the Budapest Treaty is recognized to fulfill the requirement of patent procedure in 55 member countries.

The MCC scientists are actively involved in the research programmes relating to microbial diversity, metagenomics, ecology and taxonomy, using both classical and molecular approaches.

Objectives
 The centre focuses on basic research in the areas of microbial diversity, microbial taxonomy, microbial genomics and proteomics etc.
 Isolation and identification of microorganisms from various environmental niches.
 Preservation of microbial biodiversity from niche areas as metagenomic libraries.
 Development of new strategies for isolation of "not yet cultured" microbes.
 To provide consultation services for patent deposits, preservation, propagation, biodeterioration, industrial problems, biosystematics and microbial biodiversity issues etc.
 To serve as national facility for microbial culture collection, deposit and the supply of authentic microbial cultures.
 To serve as an International Depositary Authority (IDA).
 To establish and conduct workshops, seminars, symposia and training programmes in the area of microbial identification, preservation and advanced areas of microbial taxonomy and phylogeny.

See also
 European Culture Collections' Organisation (ECCO), Denmark
 German Resource Centre for Biological Material (DSMZ), Germany
 Culture Collection, University of Göteborg (CCUG), Sweden
 American Type Culture Collection (ATCC), United States
 Japan Collection of Microorganisms (JCM), Japan
 World Federation for Culture Collections (WFCC)

References

1. http://www.hindustantimes.com/india-news/pune-scientists-discover-three-new-microbes-that-grew-on-cellphone-screens/story-H3oPgUDljUlN6bWkrrZ4XP.html
2. http://www.ndtv.com/pune-news/how-bugs-make-smart-homes-in-your-smartphones-pune-scientists-found-1666371

External links
 National College Culture Collection Centre
 National Centre For Cell Science
 WFCC
 WFCC-MIRCEN World Data Centre for Microorganisms
 CABRI
 International Congress of Culture Collections
 The International Air Transport Association
 ECCO (European Culture Collection Organisation)

Culture collections
Microbiology organizations
Biotechnology in India